Film club may refer to:

 Filmclub, a UK education charity
 The Film Club, a 2007 book by David Gilmour
 Film society, a membership-based film viewing club